Manik Prabhu Temple is a mandir in Mominpet, Andhra Pradesh, India.  It was built by Kotra Janaiah Gupta in 1861.

Hindu temples in Ranga Reddy district
Ranga Reddy district